Stacey Levine is an American novelist, short story author, and journalist. Born in St. Louis, Missouri, she attended The University of Missouri's journalism school and the University of Washington. Her fiction and criticism have appeared in numerous journals, including The Washington [D.C.] Review, Fence, The Denver Quarterly, Tin House, the Notre Dame Review, the Iowa Review, The American Book Review, Nest-A Journal of Interiors, The Seattle Times, Bookforum, The Stranger, and others.

Career
She wrote the script for a radio play, The Post Office (1996), and a one-act play, Susan Moneymaker, Large and Small, published as a chapbook by Belladonna Books (NYC) and produced in Seattle. She wrote the libretto for an historical puppet opera, The Wreck of the St. Nikolai (2004); this work was directed and performed in Seattle by  cellist Lori Goldston and accordionist Kyle Hanson.

In the early-to mid-2000s (decade), Levine, among other authors, contributed to Clear Cut Press, a venue with an artistic vision and trajectory first articulated by Clear Cut publishers Matthew Stadler and Richard Jensen during a particularly heady artistic DIY zeitgeist in the region. Until 2005, Levine wrote features and interviews for *The Stranger* under then-editor Emily White.  Stacey Levine was a featured guest speaker at Copenhagen's Prosa Fest, at the 2008 &NOW Festival at Chapman University, Brown University, Syracuse University, The University of Illinois-Urbana/Champaign, San Francisco State University, The Art Institute of Chicago, and programs. She has read from her work at kgb bar, PS1, The Drawing Center, and Unnameable Books in New York; City Lights Bookstore, and other venues.

Levine's work has been translated from English into Danish and Japanese. She lives in Seattle, where she continues to write fiction, teach, and publish.

Reception
Reviewer and filmmaker Kristy Eldridge remarked of Levine's 1998 novel Dra---: "[It] takes place at the site of the earliest human issues. Levine even uses overtly Freudian underpinnings, as Dra--- at one point nestles jealously between a man and woman who are trying to have sex...though her sexuality is located at such a submerged area of childish fantasy that it could scarcely be termed a 'drive.' Levine evokes the early stages of longing with beautiful, arresting prose."

Bookforum described Levine's work as "brilliantly unnerving."  Another Bookforum review of 2009 story collection The Girl With Brown Fur described the work as "edgy and brittle, spare and stabbing," and her sentences as possessing "throat-clutching beauty."

Time Out New York noted Levine's 2005 novel Frances Johnson as possessing "an uncanny vibe...and full of weird lacunae." Stephen Beachy, in the San Francisco Bay Guardian, observed: "If Levine's worlds sometimes evoke those of French writer Marie Redonnet or Canadian Steve Wiener, these psychic zones are entirely her own."

Awards and recognition
Levine received a Stranger Genius Award for Literature in 2009, and two of her books were named as Finalists for the Washington State Book Award in Fiction. Her work received a PEN/West Fiction award in 1994. She has received a number of writing grants and fellowships.

Bibliography 
The Girl With Brown Fur: Tales and Stories (Starcherone/Dzanc, 2011)
Frances Johnson (novel) (Verse Chorus Press, 2010);(Clear Cut Press, 2005)
Susan Moneymaker, Large and Small (one-act play) (Belladonna Books, 2006)
Dra--- (novel) (Verse Chorus Press 2012/Sun & Moon Press, 1998)
My Horse and Other Stories (Sun & Moon Press, 1994)

References

External links
Official website
Interviewed by Tao Lin
Kill Rock Stars: Stacey Levine and Peter Toliver
Stacey Levine interviewed by Michael Silverblatt on KCRW's Bookworm
Interview of author Ben Marcus
Stacey Levine Audio Recording on Pistil Books Online
Review of The Girl with Brown Fur in The Believer
"Stacey Levine is the proud owner of a sheet cake"

Fiction online
 "They Only Liked and Enjoyed Lesser People"
  excerpt from Dra---
 "Conference Center Romance"

Year of birth missing (living people)
Living people
20th-century American novelists
21st-century American novelists
University of Missouri alumni
University of Washington alumni
American women novelists
American women short story writers
Writers from St. Louis
Writers from Seattle
American women journalists
20th-century American women writers
21st-century American women writers
20th-century American short story writers
21st-century American short story writers
Novelists from Missouri
Novelists from Washington (state)
20th-century American non-fiction writers
21st-century American non-fiction writers